Lycians is the name of various peoples who lived, at different times, in  Lycia, a geopolitical area in Anatolia (also known as Asia Minor).

History

The earliest known inhabitants of the area were the Solymoi (or Solymi),  also known as the Solymians, who may have spoken a Semitic language. Later in prehistory, another people, known as  the Milyae (or Milyans) migrated to the same area; they spoke an Anatolian language (Indo-European) language  known as Milyan and the area was known as Milyas.

According to Herodotus, Milyas was subsequently settled by a people originating in Crete, whose endonym was trm̃mili – the hellenized form of this name was  Termilae (Τερμίλαι). Under a leader named Sarpedon, the Termilae had been driven out of Crete (according to Herodotus) by Minos and settled in a large part of Milyas. Subsequently, the Milyae were concentrated increasingly in the adjoining mountains, whereas the Termilae remained a maritime people. The area occupied by the Termilae gradually became known to them as trm̃mis.

Greek sources referred to trm̃mis as Lykia (Latin: Lycia). The reason for this, according to Greek mythology, was that an Athenian aristocrat named Lykos (Lycus) and his followers settled in trm̃mis, after being exiled from Athens. The land was known to the Greeks as Lukia (later Lykia; Latin Lycia) and its inhabitants were referred to as Lukiae (later Lykiae; Latin Lyciani). However, trm̃mili remained their endonym.

From the 5th or 4th centuries BCE, Lycia came under increasing Greek social and political influences. The Lycian language became extinct and was replaced by Ancient Greek, some time around 200 BCE.

Photios I of Constantinople wrote that Theopompus in one of his books mention how the Lycians, under the command of their king Pericles fought against Telmessos and they managed to corner them within their walls and forced them to negotiate.

During the period of Alexander the Great, Nearchus was appointed viceroy of Lycia and of the land adjacent to it as far as Mount Taurus.

Later classical scholars offer differing and sometimes plainly erroneous accounts of the Lycians. Strabo distinguished "Trojan Lycians" from the Termilae mentioned by Herodotus. Cicero stated flatly that the Lycians were a Greek tribe.

Culture 

According to Herodotus, the culture and customs of the Lycians resembled a hybrid of Cretan culture (like that of the Termilae) and that of the neighboring Carians (the Carians spoke an Anatolian language and one might infer from this that they were closely connected culturally to the Milyae). For instance, Herodotus mentioned a unique custom, whereby Lycian males named "themselves after their mothers" and emphasized their  "mother's female ascendants". This passage has normally been understood as meaning that the Lycians were a matrilineal society.

In Greek culture, Lycia (like Delos and Delphi) was sacred to Apollo, who was also known as Lycian, Delian and Pythian (Delphi). In the Homeric Hymns, Apollo is mentioned as the lord of Lycia: "O Lord, Lycia is yours and lovely Maeonia and Miletus, charming city by the sea, but over wave-girt Delos you greatly reign your own self". Bacchylides in his Epinician Odes, called Apollo "lord of the Lycians'. Pindar in his Pythian Odes, called Apollo the "lord of Lycia and Delos, you who love the Castalian spring of Parnassus". In the Aristophanes work The Knights, at some point Cleon called Apollo the god of Lycia. Semos the Delian wrote: "Some say the birth of Apollo took place in Lycia, others Delos, others Zoster in Attica, others Tegyra in Boeotia."

The 2nd century CE geographer Pausanias wrote that the Lycians in Patara showed a bronze bowl in their temple of Apollo, saying that Telephus dedicated it and Hephaestus made it. In addition, Pausanias also wrote that the Lycian poet Olen composed some of the oldest Greek hymns. Clement of Alexandria wrote that the statues of Zeus and Apollo, along with the lions that were dedicated to them, were created by Phidias. Solinus wrote that the Lycians dedicated a city to Hephaestus and called it Hephaestia.

Archaeology
Throughout the 1950s, P. Demargne and H. Metzger meticulously explored the site of Xanthos in Lycia, which included an acropolis. Metzger reported the discovery of Geometric pottery dating the occupation of the citadel to the 8th century BCE. J.M. Cook concluded that these discoveries constituted the earliest form of material culture in Lycia since the region may have been uninhabited throughout prehistoric times. The Lycians may ultimately have been nomadic settlers who descended into the southwestern areas of Asia Minor during the 8th century BCE.

See also
Lycia
Lycian language
Lycian script
Carians
Mysians
Lydians
Lukka lands

References

Sources
Cook, J.M. "Greek Archaeology in Western Asia Minor". Archaeological Reports, No. 6 (1959 - 1960), pp. 27–57.

 
Ancient peoples of Anatolia
Luwians